Aechmea bruggeri is a species in the genus Aechmea. This species is endemic to Brazil.

References

brueggeri
Flora of Brazil